Mom Luang Panadda Diskul (born 26 August 1956) is a Thai civil servant and independent politician. He was Governor of the provinces of Nakhon Pathom and Chiang Mai, Deputy Permanent Secretary of the Ministry of Interior and Permanent Secretary of the Office of the Prime Minister. From 2014 to 2016 he was Minister attached to the Prime Minister's Office and since 2016 he has been Deputy Minister of Education of Thailand.

Early life and education 
Panadda Diskul is the only son of Mom Rajawongse Sangkadis Diskul, a diplomat who served as ambassador of Thailand to Malaysia, Switzerland, the Vatican and founder of the Varadis Palace Museum Foundation and Manthana Diskul na Ayudhya. He is a great-grandson of Prince Damrong Rajanubhab, the first Minister of the Interior of Siam. The name "Panadda" comes from Pali and means "great-grandson"; His nickname is Khun Len (คุณเหลน), also meaning "great-grandson". The lower nobility title Mom Luang indicates his remote royal lineage. Panadda is married to Amporn Diskul na Ayudhya, they have one son.

Panadda attended the Prasarnmit Demonstration School, Srinakharinwirot University He studied at Brigham Young University, graduating with a Master's Degree in International Relations. Later he completed courses in Thai-Japanese history at Sophia University, and in higher administration at the National Defence College of Thailand in 2007.

Careers 
After graduation, Panadda taught as a lecturer in law and social sciences at the Chulachomklao Royal Military Academy. He then became an official in the Ministry of the Interior, initially working in the Foreign Affairs Division in the position of Foreign Affairs Officer. In 1998, he was appointed Director of Political and Administrative Strategy in the Strategy and Planning Office. The following year he became the Office Director of the Minister of the Interior. In 2003, Panadda moved to the provincial administration and became deputy governor of Samut Sakhon Province. A year later, he took up the same post in Pathum Thani Province, and in 2007, Buri Ram Province. During this period, he simultaneously served as a security consultant in the office of the Permanent Secretary in the Ministry of the Interior.

In 2009, he was appointed as provincial governor of Nakhon Pathom, and in 2011 as that of Chiang Mai Province. After two years in Chiang Mai, he returned to the Interior Ministry, where he was appointed Deputy Permanent Secretary for security and foreign affairs.

Political careers 
After the coup of 2014, Panadda was moved to the Office of the Prime Minister, where in 2015 he was first Permanent Secretary before being appointed as a minister of the Prime Minister's Office. In a cabinet reshuffle in December 2016, Panadda was moved to the Ministry of Education as Deputy Minister. According to disclosures provided to the National Anti-Corruption Commission, Panadda was the richest member of the Cabinet at the beginning of 2017, with assets of 1.3 billion baht. His fortune consists mainly of valuable land in the Bangkok districts of Nang Loeng and Bang Sue. Among other things, Panadda owns and manages Prince Damrong Rajanubhab Civil Servant Training School of the Varadis Palace Museum & Library, the former residence of his great-grandfather, and home to the Damrong Rajanubhab Library.

Awards and decorations 
Panadda Diskul is an Honorary Doctor of Administrative Sciences from Rajabhat University of Chiang Mai and Maejo University. He is a Knight Grand Cordon, Special Class of the Order of the White Elephant and the Order of the Crown of Thailand, and a Grand Companion (Third Class) of the Order of Chula Chom Klao.

References 

1956 births
Panadda Diskul
Panadda Diskul
Living people
Panadda Diskul
Panadda Diskul
Panadda Diskul